Taekwondo at the 2007 Pan American Games  was held in Rio de Janeiro, Brazil, from July 14 to July 17, 2007, at Pavilhão 4A of the Riocentro Sports Complex. There were a total number of eight medal events, four each for men and women.

Medal summary

Men's events

Women's events

Medal table

Events

July 14

Men's Flyweight -58 kg

Women's Flyweight -49 kg

July 15

Men's Featherweight -68 kg

Women's Featherweight -57 kg

July 16

Men's Welterweight -80 kg

Women's Welterweight -67 kg

July 17

Men's Heavyweight +80 kg

Women's Heavyweight +67 kg

Participating nations
A total of 108 taekwondo athletes from 30 countries competed at the 2007 Pan American Games:

References
 Schedule and results at the 2007 Pan American Games official website
 Athletes by Sport at the 2007 Pan American Games official website

External links
 2007 Pan American Games Official Site

Pan American Games
2007
Events at the 2007 Pan American Games